The Diocese of Birmingham is a diocese founded in 1905 in the Church of England's Province of Canterbury, covering the north-west of the traditional county of Warwickshire, the south-east of the traditional county of Staffordshire and the north-east of the traditional county of Worcestershire (now the central section of the West Midlands and small parts of south Staffordshire, north Warwickshire and north Worcestershire) in England.

Cathedral
The see is in the centre of the City of Birmingham, where the seat of the diocese is located at the Cathedral Church of Saint Philip.

The 18th-century parish church of Saint Philip in Birmingham was elevated to cathedral status in 1905 when the see was founded, on 13 January 1905. Previously the area had been part of the Diocese of Worcester.

Bishops
Besides the diocesan Bishop of Birmingham (vacant) and the Bishop suffragan of Aston (Anne Hollinghurst; which see was created in 1954), there are three retired bishops resident in (or near) the diocese who are licensed to serve as honorary assistant bishops:
2002–present: Maurice Sinclair is a retired Presiding Bishop of the Southern Cone living in Selly Park.
2003–present: Mark Santer is a retired diocesan Bishop of Birmingham living in Moseley.
2005–present: Iraj Mottahedeh is a retired diocesan Bishop of Iran who lives in Church Aston, Shropshire, in the neighbouring Lichfield diocese.

Since 1994, alternative episcopal oversight (for parishes in the diocese who reject the ministry of women priests) is provided by the provincial episcopal visitor, the Bishop suffragan of Oswestry (since 2023 Paul Thomas), who is licensed as an honorary assistant bishop of the diocese in order to facilitate his work there.

Archdeaconries and deaneries 
The former deaneries of Yardley and Bordesley were merged in 2000. Central Birmingham was known as Birmingham City until 1996 and then Birmingham City Centre until 2004.

*including Cathedral

Churches 
Last fully updated 8 September 2018.

Not in a deanery

Deanery of Aston

Deanery of Coleshill

Deanery of Polesworth

Deanery of Solihull

Deanery of Sutton Coldfield

Deanery of Yardley and Bordesley

Deanery of Central Birmingham

Deanery of Edgbaston

Deanery of Handsworth

Deanery of King's Norton

Deanery of Moseley

Deanery of Shirley

Deanery of Warley

Safeguarding Controversy
In December 2018 the diocese was criticised for its use of a Non-disclosure Agreement (NDA) in relation to an abuse case. The survivor described the ten-year process since her first complaint as "haphazard" and claimed she was warned by an unnamed bishop not to talk to the media as it wouldn't be "very godly". The diocese carried out an independent review which delivered damning findings about the handling of her case by the (then) Bishop of Birmingham, David Urquhart, and then forced the survivor to sign the NDA before she was permitted to see the review into her own case. The Archbishop of Canterbury, Justin Welby, had previously questioned the legitimacy of these agreements in March 2018 at the Independent Inquiry into Child Sexual Abuse  The Bishop of Buckingham, Alan Wilson, commenting on the scandal said it was the fourth "corrupt and destructive" non-disclosure agreement (NDA) that had come to his attention since September. 

He said he was unable to share details of the other cases but that some were "complete shockers". The Diocese of Birmingham said the NDA had been used to ensure that those who read the report did not share information provided by other contributors who wanted to remain anonymous. A Church of England spokesperson stated that guidance would be sent to all dioceses to discourage use of these agreements. The bishop and the diocese apologised to the survivor and her husband.

See also

Religion in Birmingham

References

Church of England statistics 2002
Book: Canon Doctor Terry Slater, 2005, A Centenary History of the Diocese of Birmingham, Phillimore, Chichester

External links
Diocesan website
Churches in the Diocese of Birmingham ("A Church Near You")

 
1905 establishments in England
Christian organizations established in 1905
Christianity in the West Midlands (county)
Christianity in Worcestershire
Dioceses established in the 20th century
Birmingham
Religion in Staffordshire
Religion in Warwickshire